Maduka Christopher Udeh (born 3 September 1997) is a Nigerian footballer who plays as centre-back for Norwegian club Øygarden.

Career
On 9 December 2015, Udeh signed a two-year contract with Slovakian side AS Trenčín. He made his professional debut for AS Trenčín against ŠK Slovan Bratislava on 27 February 2016.

References

External links
 AS Trenčín official club profile
 
 Futbalnet Profile

1997 births
Living people
Nigerian footballers
Nigerian expatriate footballers
Association football defenders
AS Trenčín players
1. FC Tatran Prešov players
FC ViOn Zlaté Moravce players
Slovak Super Liga players
Expatriate footballers in Slovakia
Sportspeople from Ibadan